Treasure of Khan is an adventure novel by Clive Cussler and Dirk Cussler, and is the nineteenth to feature Cussler's most famous protagonist, Dirk Pitt.

Overview 

The book is about a Mongolian oil tycoon and his attempts to gain control over the world petroleum markets. It also has a secondary plot of a search for the treasures in the tombs of Genghis Khan and Khublai Khan.

Plot 

A relatively small oil company headed by Borjin, a Mongolian who is bent on taking control of the world oil market and re-uniting the Chinese province of Inner Mongolia (where he has found significant oil deposits buried at unusual depths) with Mongolia, has stolen a machine which can create an earthquake. He uses the machine to destroy major oil production facilities through the world, crippling China's and the rest of the world's oil supply in a matter of weeks. He then uses this shortage to make an offer to supply China all the oil it needs. He demands that Inner Mongolia be ceded to Mongolia, and China pay market price for the oil he will supply them, which he guarantees will meet the colossal demands of the Chinese economy. China accepts this deal, not knowing of the hidden oil deposits they are handing to him. Dirk Pitt intervenes to end the situation, and discovers that the grave of Genghis Khan has been located by Borjin.

A subplot centers on Kublai Khan's second invasion of Japan by Mongolia, and in its failure, inadvertently discovering what we now know as Hawaii. In the present, Dirk Pitt discovers Kublai Khan's tomb is in a lava tube in Hawaii along with a great treasure. He does this after finding an ancient scroll which had been buried for centuries, was excavated during the early days of the War of Resistance. The pertinent clues were then quickly lost, and found again by Pitt.

Dirk Pitt novels
2006 American novels

Novels set in Mongolia
G. P. Putnam's Sons books
Novels set in Inner Mongolia
Collaborative novels